Chhatarpur was one of the princely states of India during the period of the British Raj. The state was founded in 1785 and its capital was located in Chhatarpur, Madhya Pradesh.

Chhatarpur's last ruler signed the accession to the Indian Union on 1 January 1950.

History
Chhatarpur was founded in 1785. It is named after the Chhatrasal, the founder of Bundelkhand, and contains his cenotaph. The state was ruled by his descendants until 1785.  The state was guaranteed to Kunwar Sone Singh Ponwar in 1806 by the British Raj.  
In 1854 Chhatarpur would have lapsed to the British government for want of direct heirs under the doctrine of lapse, but was conferred on Jagat Raj as a special act of grace.

In 1901 the town of Chhatarpur had a population of 10,029, a high school and manufactured paper and coarse cutlery.  The state also contained the British cantonment of Nowgaon.
After the independence of India in 1947, the Rajas of Chhatarpur acceded to India, and Chhatarpur, together with the rest of Bundelkhand Agency, became part of the Indian state of Vindhya Pradesh.  Vindhya Pradesh was merged into the state of Madhya Pradesh in 1956.

Rulers
The rulers bore the title of Raja and latter Maharaja.

Rajas 
The Pawar (Parmar) Rajput dynasty ruled Chhatarpur State.

       1785  – 1816 Kunwar Sone Shah                   (b. circa 1765 – d. 1816)
       1816 – 1854 Partap Singh                       (b. circa 1810 – d. 1854)
       1854 – 4 November 1867 Jaghat Singh                       (b. 1846 – d. 1867)
 14 November  1867 – 1895 Vishwanath Singh                   (b. 1866 – d. 1932)

Maharajas

       1895 -  5 April 1932 Vishwanath Singh                   (s.a.)
 5 Apr 1932 – 15 Aug 1947 Bhawani Singh                      (b. 1921 - d. 2006)

Titular Maharajas
 1947 – 2006 Bhawani Singh (S.A)
 2006 – Present Vikram Singh Bahadur

See also 
Bundelkhand Agency
Vindhya Pradesh

References

Princely states of Bundelkhand
Rajputs
Chhatarpur district
1785 establishments in India
1950 disestablishments in India